The Presbyterian Church in Korea (JaeGun), also known as the Korean Presbyterian Reconstruction Church, is a branch of Presbyterianism in South Korea. In 2004 it had about 23,600 members in 113 congregations.

History 
The branch originated from the Presbyterian Church of Korea.

This branch took a radical approach to the issue of Shinto shrine worship. After the liberation Reconstruction movement took place within the established church, and through an act of repentance of all pastors who had worshipped the shrine, and finally formed these segments a reconstruction church. These movements started in both the North and South. 

During the Korean War, the movement in the North suffered oppression from the Communists. They moved to the South and united with the church in the South, but this didn't last long. In 1954 the General assembly decided to ordain women both in the ministry and to leadership. The decision led to dissension. In 1955 the General Assembly confirmed the decision and dismissed the opposing segments.

In 1959 it adopted the current name.

Beliefs 
It adheres to the Apostles Creed and Westminster Confession.

References 

Presbyterian denominations in South Korea
Presbyterian denominations in Asia